Albarella may refer to:

 Umberto Albarella, Italian-British archaeologist, prehistorian, and activist
 Albarella International Open, golf tournament on the Challenge Tour, played in Italy
 , an island in the Veneto region of Italy

See also 

 Albarelli
 Albarello (disambiguation)